Rossland or Vikebø is a village area in Alver municipality, in Vestland county, Norway. The village lies along the shores of the Rosslandspollen bay, and it is the largest village area on the northern part of the island of Holsnøy.

References

Alver (municipality)
Villages in Vestland